Michael Caruso (born 25 May 1983) is an Australian professional motor racing driver. Caruso competes in the Pirtek Enduro Cup, co-driving a Holden ZB Commodore for Team 18 alongside Mark Winterbottom.

Early career
Caruso began his career in go-karts at age 12, before graduating to Formula Ford in 2001. He moved to Formula 3 in 2002 and won the Australian Formula 3 Championship in 2003. Despite offers to move to FIA Formula 3000 in Europe, he chose to join the Holden Young Lions team in the V8 Supercars Development Series for 2004. After a poor start he quit the team mid-season. In 2005 Caruso competed in the first two rounds of the Australian Formula 3 Championship, before moving to Europe to be test and reserve driver for the F3000 outfit Team Astromega.

Touring cars

Development Series
In 2006 he returned to Australia and to the V8 Supercars Development Series with Jim Morton's Decina Racing, finishing 4th in the championship. In 2007 he was runner-up in the Development Series, again with Jim Morton's renamed Ford Rising Star program. He also made three main-game V8 Supercars starts in this period. The first of which was at the 2006 Bathurst 1000 as a replacement for Mark Porter in a Brad Jones Racing entry. Porter had a serious crash on the Friday of the event and later died in hospital. In 2007, Caruso entered the Sandown 500 and Bathurst 1000 with WPS Racing.

Garry Rogers Motorsport
In 2008, Caruso was signed to compete in his first full season in V8 Supercars, driving a Holden VE Commodore for Garry Rogers Motorsport, where he replaced Dean Canto. In 2009, Caruso won his first championship race at the Skycity Triple Crown at Hidden Valley Raceway. He also finished on the podium at the 2009 Bathurst 1000, co-driving with Lee Holdsworth, and in the second race of the Sydney 500. Caruso stayed at the team until 2012, only scoring one further podium in this period.

Nissan Motorsport
In 2013, Caruso moved to Nissan Motorsport, a four car team running the Nissan Altima L33. The team was the first to introduce a new manufacturer to the category under the New Generation V8 Supercar (then known as Car of the Future) regulations in 2013. The team largely struggled with the new package and Caruso finished 23rd in the championship. The highlight of the year for Caruso was at the Winton 360, where he finished second in the opening race. Caruso had been leading the race at the conclusion of the first half of the split race, however was beaten by teammate James Moffat to victory in the second half. 

In 2014, Caruso finished a career-high 10th in the championship, despite only scoring one podium, in the second race of the Gold Coast 600. Caruso also took pole at the non-championship V8 Supercars Challenge race, a support event to the Australian Grand Prix. Having featured Norton 360 sponsorship in 2013 and 2014, from 2015 onwards, Caruso sported a corporate Nissan and Nismo livery. After another lean year in 2015, Caruso began 2016 strongly at the season-opening Adelaide 500. Caruso finished second in the Sunday race and led the championship following the event. At the 2016 CrownBet Darwin Triple Crown, Caruso won his second career championship race, seven years after his first and coincidentally once again at Hidden Valley Raceway. On the 30th of January 2019 it was announced that Caruso would lose his drive with Nissan Motorsport. He will not compete full time in 2019 and is yet to announce an ENDURO drive.

Career results

Supercars Championship results
(Races in bold indicate pole position) (Races in italics indicate fastest lap)

Bathurst 1000 results

† Porter was the entered driver but was killed in a support race. Caruso would replace him.

References

External links 
 Official Website
 V8 Supercars Official Profile
 Driver Database profile
 Profile on Racing Reference

1983 births
Australian Formula 3 Championship drivers
Living people
Racing drivers from Sydney
Sportsmen from New South Wales
Supercars Championship drivers
Australian Endurance Championship drivers
Kelly Racing drivers
Garry Rogers Motorsport drivers
Nismo drivers